Kenneth Wright (born 1 August 1985) is a Scottish footballer who plays as a striker for Thorniewood United in the Scottish Junior Football Association, West Region. He has previously played in the Scottish Premier League for Motherwell.

Career
Wright started his career at local professional club Motherwell in 2002. At the time, the SPL club were giving a lot of young players an opportunity due to administration, forcing a number of cuts. This meant Wright would be one of the fortunate youth players given their chance. However, due to injury, Wright was never able to show the goal-scoring ability that he undoubtedly had, and he was released by the Fir Park club at the end of the 2005-06 season. Wright made just 23 League appearances, scoring one goal (the winning goal against Aberdeen).

On his release from Motherwell, Wright spent three seasons at lower league level, playing for Stranraer, Albion Rovers, Arbroath, and Elgin City.

After a spell playing amateur football in Lanarkshire, latterly with Eddlewood AFC, he joined Forth Wanderers in 2011. Wright had brief spells at Carluke Rovers and Shotts Bon Accord before re-signing for Forth in November 2012

Wright left Forth to return to amateur level with Blantyre Celtic but stepped up to join Thorniewood United in the summer of 2014.

External links

References

Living people
1985 births
Footballers from Bellshill
Scottish footballers
Motherwell F.C. players
Stranraer F.C. players
Albion Rovers F.C. players
Arbroath F.C. players
Elgin City F.C. players
Carluke Rovers F.C. players
Forth Wanderers F.C. players
Shotts Bon Accord F.C. players
Thorniewood United F.C. players
Scottish Premier League players
Scottish Football League players
Scottish Junior Football Association players
Association football forwards